Lübbert or Luebbert is a surname. Notable people with the surname include:

Eduard Lübbert (1830–1889), German classical philologist
Orlando Lübbert (born 1945), Chilean screenwriter and film director
Óscar Luebbert (born 1956), Mexican politician